Jiří Sloup (30 April 1953 – 20 December 2017) was a Czech footballer who played as a midfielder.

Honours

 1982–83 Czechoslovak First League

External links
 
 

1953 births
2017 deaths
Czech footballers
Association football midfielders
FC Viktoria Plzeň players
Bohemians 1905 players
Czechoslovakia international footballers
Czechoslovak footballers